The Sissle (Swiss German) is a  long river in the Swiss canton of Aargau in Switzerland. It is a tributary of the Rhine and drains the eastern part of the Fricktal. The largest town on the river is Frick.

Shortly after the source, the river breaks through a water gap between the Dreierberg mountain and the Zeiher Homberg and then falls off rapidly. It passed the Talmatt and delimits the district Iberg of the municipality of Zeihen. The river had to be canalized here when the railway was constructed.

From here on, the landscape is fairly flat and the river follows the A3 motorway. It flows freely until Hornussen and is then canalized until Eiken, where it changes direction from northwest to north, and enters the Rhine valley. It receives the left tributary Bruggbach, coming from Wittnau. The last  of the Sissle meander strongly.

Rivers of Switzerland
Rivers of Aargau